Roman wormwood is a common name for several plants and may refer to:
 Artemisia pontica
 Ambrosia artemisiifolia